Dicliptera brachiata (false mint, wild mudwort, branched foldwing) is a species of plant in the family Acanthaceae. It is an herbaceous perennial native to North America, ranging from the eastern United States to Central America.

Description
Dicliptera brachiata grows 0.3–1.0 m tall and has simple ovate leaves. The leaves are smooth, glabrous, and pinnately veined with entire margins.

Taxonomy
Dicliptera brachiata contains the following varieties:
 Dicliptera brachiata var. glandulosa
 Dicliptera brachiata var. attenuata
 Dicliptera brachiata var. ruthii

References

Species described in 1824
Flora of North America